Bassignac-le-Bas is a commune in the Corrèze department in the Nouvelle-Aquitaine region of south-central France.

The inhabitants of the commune are known as Bassignacois or Bassignacoises.

Geography
Bassignac-le-Bas is located some 30 km south-east of Brive-la-Gaillarde and 10 km south-west of Argentat. Access to the commune is by the D116 which comes from Argentat in the north-east and passes along the riverbank through the commune before continuing south to join the D940 at Beaulieu-sur-Dordogne. The D41 from Beaulieu-sur-Dordogne to La Chapelle-Saint-Géraud passes through the south-west of the commune. The D136 comes from Brivezac across the river and passes through the commune eastwards to join the D41 in the east of the commune. Apart from the village there are the hamlets of Vaurs, Recoudier, Le Peuch, Culagne, Chaviolle, La Gendrie, Le Gasquet, Brette, and La Laurie in the commune. The commune is mixed forest and farmland.

The Dordogne river forms the western and northern borders of the commune as it flows south to eventually join the Garonne at Bayon-sur-Gironde. The Ruisseau de la Borie flows from a small lake in the east of the commune westwards to join the Dordogne. The Ruisseau de Layssot forms the north-eastern border of the commune as it flows north to join the Dordogne. The Ruisseau de Chauvac forms the southern border of the commune as it flows west to join the Dordogne.

History
Bassignac-le-Bas appears as Baßignac le Bas on the 1750 Cassini Map and as Bafignac leBas on the 1790 version.

Heraldry

Administration

List of Successive Mayors

Demography
In 2017 the commune had 91 inhabitants.

Culture and heritage

Religious heritage

The Parish Church of Saint Martin contains three items that are registered as historical objects:
A Statue: Sainte Fauste (15th century)
A Group Sculpture: Virgin of Pity (15th century)
A Bronze Bell (1611)

See also
Communes of the Corrèze department

References

Communes of Corrèze